Jin Xiangjun (born July 1964) is a Chinese politician, currently serving as deputy party secretary of Shanxi. 

He was a delegate to the 11th National People's Congress. He was a representative of the 18th National Congress of the Chinese Communist Party and 19th National Congress of the Chinese Communist Party. He is a representative of the 20th National Congress of the Chinese Communist Party and a member of the 20th Central Committee of the Chinese Communist Party.

Early life and education
Jin was born in Jianghua County, Hunan, in July 1964. In 1983, he entered Chengdu Institute of Telecommunication (now University of Electronic Science and Technology of China), where he majored in computer software. He also studied in the public administration advanced training course jointly run by the School of Public Administration of Tsinghua University and the Kennedy School of Government of Harvard University in 2003. He received his doctor's degree in management from Huazhong University of Science and Technology in 2010.

Career
Jin joined the Chinese Communist Party (CCP) in November 1984. After University in 1990, he was assigned as an official to the Sichuan Provincial Department of Science and Technology. 

Jin was transferred to south China's Hainan province and appointed an official of the Hainan National Spark Demonstration Zone Management Committee in August 1992 and than the Hainan Airlines Tourism Development Co., Ltd. in March 1993. In December 1996, he became head of Fund Management Office of Hainan Social Security Bureau, but having held the position for only a year and a half.
 
In September 1998, Jin was transferred to southwest China's Guangxi Zhuang Autonomous Region and appointed deputy head of the Labor Department of Guangxi Zhuang Autonomous Region, which was reshuffled as Department of Labor and Social Security of Guangxi Zhuang Autonomous Region in April 2000. In October 2000, he became vice mayor of Yulin, rising to mayor in May 2003. He was party secretary, the top political position in the city, in February 2009, in addition to serving as chairman of its People's Congress. In January 2014, he moved to Fangchenggang and held five positions, including party secretary, chairman of the People's Congress, secretary of the Working Committee of Dongxing National Key Development and Opening up Pilot Zone, honorary president of Fangchenggang Disabled Persons' Federation, and honorary president of Fangchenggang Red Cross Society.

In January 2018, he was elevated to vice mayor of Tianjin, concurrently serving as director of the China (Tianjin) Pilot Free Trade Zone Management Committee since April 2019. He was appointed secretary-general of the CCP Tianjin Municipal Committee in January 2021 and was admitted to member of the Standing Committee of the CCP Tianjin Municipal Committee, the city's top authority. He was chosen as deputy party secretary of Tianjin in March 2022.

On 29 December 2022, he was transferred to north China's Shanxi province and appointed deputy party secretary.

References

1964 births
Living people
People from Jianghua Yao Autonomous County
University of Electronic Science and Technology of China alumni
Huazhong University of Science and Technology alumni
People's Republic of China politicians from Hunan
Chinese Communist Party politicians from Hunan
Members of the 20th Central Committee of the Chinese Communist Party
Delegates to the 11th National People's Congress